This is a list of entities that have issued postage stamps at some point since stamps were introduced in 1840.  The list includes any kind of governmental entity or officially approved organisation that has issued distinctive types of stamp .  These include post offices in foreign countries and postal services organised by military occupations, international organisations, colonies, provinces, city-states and some revolutionary movements.  The list includes members of the Universal Postal Union that are also listed at postal organisations.

Many of these entities are historic and some were very short-lived indeed.  Philatelists and stamp collectors often refer to the entities that no longer issue stamps as dead countries.

The dates are the generally agreed-upon dates of first and last stamp issues.  "Date of issue" is taken to mean the date when a particular type or variation was  issued but its usage would often continue for many years.  For example, although an entity may have issued its last stamp in 1951, actual usage may have continued until 1960: in that case, 1951 is the last stamp issue date.

Besides the period of which stamps were issued in the name of a particular entity, the list under that entity also bears any other name in which stamps had been issued for territory, name of any other entity which had had its stamps used in that territory, or new names which had subsequently replaced the name of that entity, together with their respective periods.

List
The list has been comprehensively revised to include extra entities and to direct the links away from the country articles to the (proposed) philatelic articles.

Abkhazia

Afghanistan
 Afghanistan	1870 –

Aitutaki
 Aitutaki	1972 –
 Aitutaki (New Zealand Administration)	1903 – 1932

Albania
 Albania	1913 –
 Ottoman Empire issues 1870 – 1913
 Foreign Post offices in Albania
 Occupation issues

Algeria
 Algeria	1962 –

Andorra
 Andorra (French Post Offices)	1931 –
 Andorra (Spanish Post Offices)	1928 –

Angola
 Angola	1870 –

Antarctic Territories
 Australian Antarctic Territory	1957 –
 British Antarctic Territory	1963 –
 King Edward VII Land	1908 only
 Ross Dependency	1957 –
 Victoria Land	1911 – 1912

Antigua and Barbuda

Argentina
 Argentina	1858 –

Argentine Territories
 Buenos Aires	1858 – 1862
 Córdoba	1858 only
 Corrientes	1856 – 1878

Armenia
 Armenia (pre–Soviet)	1919 – 1923
 Armenia	1992 –

Artsakh

Ascension
 Ascension	1922 –

Australia
 Australia	1913 –
 New South Wales	1850 – 1913
 Queensland	1860 – 1913
 South Australia	1855 – 1912
 Tasmania	1853 – 1912
 Van Diemen's Land	1853 – 1860
 Victoria	1850 – 1912
 Western Australia	1854 – 1912

Austria
 Austria	1850 –

Austrian Post Abroad
 Austrian post offices abroad
 Austro–Hungarian Military Post	1915 – 1918
 Austro–Hungarian Post in the Turkish Empire	1867 – 1915
 Crete (Austro–Hungarian Post)	1903 – 1914
 Italy (Austrian Occupation)	1918 only
 Lombardy and Venetia	1850 – 1866
 Montenegro (Austrian Occupation)	1917 only
 Romania (Austrian Occupation)	1917 – 1918
 Serbia (Austrian Occupation)	1916 only

Azerbaijan
 Azerbaijan	1992 –
 Azerbaijan (pre–Soviet)	1919 – 1921
 Nakhichevan	1993 only

Azores
 Azores (Acores)	1980 –
 Azores (Portuguese Colonial Issues)	1868 – 1931
 Angra 1892 - 1905
 Horta 1892 - 1905
 Ponta Delgada 1892 - 1905

Bahamas
 Bahamas	1859 –

Bahrain
 Bahrain	1960 –
 British postal agencies in Eastern Arabia	1948 - 1960

Bangladesh
 Bangladesh	1971 –

Barbados
 Barbados (Historic: Barbadoes)         1852 –

Belarus
 People's Republic of Belarus 1923
 Belarus	1992 –

Belgian Post Abroad
 Eupen and Malmedy (Belgian Occupation)	1920 only
 German East Africa (Belgian Occupation)	1916 – 1918
 Germany (Belgian Occupation)	1919 – 1920

Belgium
 Belgium	1849 –

Belize
 Belize	1973 –
 Cayes of Belize 1984 only
 British Honduras	1866 – 1973

Benin
 Benin	1976 –

Bermuda
 Bermuda	1865 –

Bhutan
 Bhutan	1962 –

Bohemia and Moravia
See Czech Republic

Bolivia
 Bolivia	1867 –

Bosnia and Herzegovina
 Bosnia & Herzegovina	1993 –
 Bosnia and Herzegovina (Ottoman Empire) before 1878
 Bosnia and Herzegovina (Austro–Hungarian Empire)	1878 – 1918
 Bosnia and Herzegovina (Provincial Issues)	1918 – 1921
 Bosnia and Herzegovina (Yugoslav Regional Issues)	1945 only
 Croatian Posts in Bosnia	1992 – 1996

Botswana
 Bechuanaland	1965 – 1966
 Bechuanaland Protectorate	1888 – 1965
 Botswana	1966 –

Brazil
 Brazil	1843 –

British Antarctic Territory
 British Antarctic Territory	1963 –

British East Africa
 British East Africa	1895 – 1903
 British East Africa Company	1890 – 1895
 East Africa and Uganda Protectorates	1903 – 1922
 Kenya and Uganda	1922 – 1935
 Kenya Uganda and Tanganyika	1935 – 1963
 Kenya Uganda and Tanzania	1965 – 1975
 Kenya Uganda Tanganyika and Zanzibar	1964 only
 Tanganyika	1922 – 1964
 Uganda Protectorate	1895 – 1902
 Zanzibar	1895 – 1967

British Guiana
 British Guiana	1850 – 1966

British Post Abroad
 British post offices in Africa – various issues
 Baghdad (British Occupation)	1917 only
 Bangkok (British Post Office)	1882 – 1885
 Batum (British Occupation)	1919 – 1920
 Beirut (British Post Office)	1906 only
 British Post Offices in the Turkish Empire	1885 – 1923
 British Postal Agencies in Eastern Arabia	1948 – 1966
 Bushire (British Occupation) 1915 only
 Cameroons (British Occupation)	1915 only
 China (British Post Offices)	1917 – 1930
 China (British Railway Administration)	1901 only
 Crete (British Post Offices)	1898 – 1899
 East Africa Forces	1943 – 1948
 Egypt (British Forces)	1932 – 1943
 Eritrea (British Administration)	1950 – 1952
 Eritrea (British Military Administration)	1948 – 1950
 German East Africa (British Occupation)	1917 only
 Iraq (British Occupation)	1918 – 1923
 Japan (British Commonwealth Occupation)	1946 – 1949
 Japan (British Post Offices)	1859 – 1879
 Long Island (British Occupation)	1916 only
 Madagascar (British Consular Mail)	1884 – 1895
 Mafia Island (British Occupation)	1915 – 1916
 Malaya (British Military Administration)	1945 – 1948
 Middle East Forces (MEF)	1942 – 1947
 Morocco Agencies	1898 – 1957
 North Borneo (BMA)	1945 only
 Salonika (British Field Office)	1916 only
 Sarawak (BMA)	1945 only
 Somalia (British Administration)	1950 only
 Somalia (British Military Administration)	1948 – 1950
 Tangier	1927 – 1957
 Tripolitania (British Administration)	1950 – 1952
 Tripolitania (British Military Administration)	1948 – 1950

British Virgin Islands
 British Virgin Islands	1866 –

Brunei
 Brunei	1895 –

Bulgaria
 Bulgaria	1879 –

Bulgarian Territories
 Dobruja (Bulgarian Occupation)	1916 only
 Eastern Rumelia	1880 – 1885
 South Bulgaria	1885 only

Burkina Faso
 Burkina Faso	1984 –
 Upper Volta	1959 – 1984

Burma
see Myanmar

Burundi

Cambodia
 Kampuchea

Cameroun
 Cameroun	1915 –

Canada
 Canada	1851–

Canadian Provinces
 British Columbia	1865 – 1868
 British Columbia and Vancouver Island	1860 only
 New Brunswick	1851 – 1868
 New Carlisle, Gaspé	1851 only
 Newfoundland	1857 – 1949
 Nova Scotia	1853 – 1868
 Prince Edward Island	1861 – 1873
 Vancouver Island	1865 only

Canal Zone
 Canal Zone	1904 – 1979

Cape of Good Hope
 British Bechuanaland	1885 – 1897
 Cape of Good Hope	1853 – 1910
 Griqualand West	1874 – 1880
 Mafeking	1900 only
 Stellaland Republic	1884 – 1885
 Vryburg	1899 – 1900

Cape Verde Islands
 Cape Verde Islands	1877 –

Cayman Islands
 Cayman Islands	1900 –

Central African Republic
 Central African Empire	1977 – 1979
 Central African Republic	1959 –

Chad
 Chad	1959 –

Chile
 Chile	1853 –
 Tierra del Fuego	1891 only

China
 Chinese Empire	1878 – 1912
 Chinese Nationalist Republic	1949 –
 Chinese People's Republic	1949 –
 Chinese Republic	1912 – 1949
 Treaty ports
 Amoy 1895 – 1896
 Chefoo 1893 – 1894
 Chinkiang 1895
 Chunking 1894
 Foochow 1895
 Hankow 1893 – 1896
 Ichang 1894
 Kiukiang 1894 – 1896
 Nanking 1896 – 1897
 Shanghai	1865 – 1898
 Wei–Hai–Wei date not established
 Wuhu 1894 – 1897
 Tientsin: Treaty port stamps from this city are regarded as bogus.

Chinese Provinces
 Kirin and Heilungkiang	1927 – 1931
 North Eastern Provinces	1946 – 1948
 Sinkiang	1915 – 1949
 Fukien	1949 only
 Hunan	1949 only
 Hupeh	1949 only
 Kansu	1949 only
 Kiangsi	1949 only
 Kwangsi	1949 only
 Manchuria	1927 – 1928
 Shensi	1949 only
 Tsingtau	1949 only
 Szechwan	1933 only
 Taiwan	1945 – 1949
 Yunnan	1926 – 1933

People's Republic of China Regional Issues
 Central China (People's Post)	1949 – 1950
 East China (People's Post)	1949 – 1950
 North China (People's Post)	1948 – 1950
 North East China (People's Post)	1946 – 1950
 North West China (People's Post)	1949 only
 Port Arthur and Dairen	1946 – 1950
 Shensi–Kansu–Ninghsia	1946 – 1949
 South China (People's Post)	1949 only
 South West China (People's Post)	1949 – 1950

Christmas Island
 Christmas Island, Indian Ocean	1958 – 1993
 Christmas Island, Australia	1993 -
 Straits Settlements	1901 - 1942

Cilicia
 Cilicia (French Occupation) 1919 – 1921

Cocos (Keeling) Islands
 Cocos (Keeling) Islands	1963 – 1993
 Cocos (Keeling) Islands, Australia	1994 -

Colombia
 Colombia	1859 –

Colombian Territories
 Antioquia	1868 – 1906
 AVIANCA	1950 – 1951
 Bolívar	1863 – 1904
 Boyacá	1899 – 1903
 Cauca	1886 only
 Cundinamarca	1870 – 1904
 Granadine Confederation	1859 – 1861
 LANSA	1950 – 1951
 New Granada	1861 only
 Santander	1884 – 1903
 Tolima	1870 – 1903

Comoros Islands
 Comoro Islands	1950 –

Congo Democratic Republic of the

 Belgian Congo	1909 – 1960
 Burundi	1962 –
 Congo Free State	1886 – 1908
 Congo Republic	1959 –

Congo Republic of the

 Zaire	1960 – 1971
 Katanga	1960 – 1963
 Ruanda – Urundi	1924 – 1962
 Rwanda	1962 –
 South Kasai	1961 – 1962
 Zaire	1971 –

Cook Islands
 Cook Islands	1892 –
 Penrhyn 1902 – 1928, 1973 –

Costa Rica
 Costa Rica	1863 –
 Guanacaste	1885 – 1889

Crete
 Crete	1900 – 1913
 Cretan Revolutionary Assembly	1905 only
 Crete (British Post Offices)
 Crete (French Post Offices) 
 Crete (Italian Post Offices) 
 Crete (Russian Post Offices)

Croatia
 Croatia	1991 –
 Croatia (Provincial Issues)	1918 – 1921
 Croatia (Semi–Autonomous State)	1941 – 1945
 Sremsko Baranjska Oblast (Croatia)	1995 – 1997
 Srpska Krajina (Croatia)	1993 – 1995

Cuba
 Cuba	1855 –

Cyprus
 Cyprus	1880 –
 Northern Cyprus

Czechia
 Bohemia and Moravia	1939 – 1945
 Czechoslovakia	1918 – 1939; 1945 – 1992
 Czech Republic	1993 –

Czechoslovakia
 Czechoslovakia	1918 – 1939; 1945 – 1992
See Czech Republic

Dahomey
See Benin

Danzig
 Danzig	1920 – 1939

Denmark
 Denmark	1851 –

Djibouti
 Obock (French Colony)	1893–1902
 Djibouti (French Colony)	1894–1902
 French Somali Coast	1902-1967
 French Territory of Afars and Issas	1967–1977
 Djibouti, Republic of	1977 –

Dominica

Dominican Republic
 Dominican Republic	1865 –

Dubai
 Dubai	1963 – 1972
See United Arab Emirates

Ecuador
 Ecuador	1865 –
 Galapagos Islands	1957 – 1959

Egypt
 Egypt	1866 –
 Gaza (Egyptian Occupation)	1948 – 1967
 Palestine (Egyptian Occupation)	1918 – 1920
 United Arab Republic	1958 – 1961

El Salvador
 El Salvador	1867 –

Equatorial Guinea
 Equatorial Guinea	1968 –

Eritrea
 Eritrea	
1893-1936 (Italian colony)

1993 –

Estonia
 Estonia 1918 – 1940; 1991 -

Eswatini
 Swaziland

Ethiopia (Abyssinia)
 Ethiopia	1894 –
 Etiopia (Italian occupation) 1936

See also

 List of entities that have issued postage stamps (F–L)
 List of entities that have issued postage stamps (M–Z)

References

Bibliography
 Stanley Gibbons Ltd, Europe and Colonies 1970, Stanley Gibbons Ltd, 1969
 Stanley Gibbons Ltd, various catalogues
 Stuart Rossiter & John Flower, The Stamp Atlas, W H Smith, 1989
 XLCR Stamp Finder and Collector's Dictionary, Thomas Cliffe Ltd, c.1960

External links
 Overview of Nederland Stadspost Zegels (Dutch City Post Stamps) not listed above
 AskPhil – Glossary of Stamp Collecting Terms
 Encyclopaedia of Postal History

$
$
Issuers